Hurlbut can refer to:
 Hurlbut Township, Logan County, Illinois, US
 Hurlbut Hall, a Harvard College dormitory
 Hurlbut Glacier, Greenland

People with the surname Hurlbut:
 Chauncey Hurlbut (1803–1885), American philanthropist whose will funded Detroit's Hurlbut Memorial Gate
 Doctor Philastus Hurlbut (1809–1883), American Latter Day Saint dissenter
 Edwin Hurlbut (1817–1905), American lawyer and politician
 Jesse Lyman Hurlbut (1843–1930), American clergyman
 Mike Hurlbut (born 1966), American ice hockey player
 Shane Hurlbut (born 1964), American cinematographer
 Spring Hurlbut (born 1952), Canadian artist
 Stephen A. Hurlbut (1815–1882), American politician, diplomat, and commander of the U.S. Army of the Gulf in the American Civil War
 Wendell "Bud" Hurlbut (1918–2011), American engineer and amusement park ride designer
 Wilbur E. Hurlbut (1867–?), American politician from Wisconsin
 William B. Hurlbut (born 1945), American neurobiologist and consulting professor at Stanford University
 William J. Hurlbut (1883–1957), American screenplay writer best known for the Bride of Frankenstein screenplay